List of notable members of the Alpha Gamma Rho fraternity.

Agriculture
Walter Clore – (Oklahoma State University, Pi)
Doyle Conner – (University of Florida, Alpha Gamma)
Adam Putnam – (University of Florida, Alpha Gamma)
Ryan Shupert - (The Ohio State University)

Commerce
Taylor Brown (Montana State University, Alpha Delta) – owner of Northern Ag radio and TV network
Wallace Jerome – founder of "The Turkey Store", of Jennie-O Turkey Store Company
Peter Oppenheimer (Cal Poly - San Luis Obispo, Chi) – CFO of Apple Inc.
James Cash Penney (University of Missouri, Theta) – founder of JC Penney Department Stores
Orville Redenbacher (Purdue University, Delta) – popcorn magnate
Orion Samuelson – farm broadcaster
Donnie Smith  (University of Tennessee – Knoxville, Alpha Kappa) – chief executive officer of Tyson Foods
Robert R. Eckert – (California State University - Chico, Beta Kappa). Eckert Orthodontic Laboratory.

Education
Emil M. Mrak (UC Berkeley, Beta - Initiated at UC Davis, Phi) - 2nd Chancellor of University of California, Davis 
Steven Leath (Iowa State, Eta, Alumnus Initiate) – president of Auburn University
Francis Tuttle (Oklahoma State, Pi) – director of Oklahoma Vo Tech System
Randy Woodson (Purdue University, Delta, Alumnus Initiate) – Chancellor of North Carolina State University
Ronnie Green (Virginia Tech, Beta Eta) – Chancellor of University of Nebraska – Lincoln

Military
Orville Emil Bloch (North Dakota State, Epsilon) – Medal of Honor recipient 
Edgar H. Lloyd (University of Arkansas, Alpha Iota) – Medal of Honor recipient 
Harry J. Michael – Medal of Honor recipient

Nobel Peace Prize
Norman Borlaug – Nobel Peace Prize winner

Sports
Todd Buchanan (Murray State University) - college basketball coach
Spud Chandler (University of Georgia, Alpha Eta) – professional baseball player
Scott Hatteberg (Washington State University, Sigma) – professional baseball player
Tim Phillips (Ohio State University, Beta) – professional swimmer
Allie Reynolds (Oklahoma State, Pi) – professional baseball player

Politics
Wayne Allard – United States Senator for Colorado 
Gary Black (University of Georgia, Alpha Eta) – Georgia Commissioner of Agriculture
Terry Branstad (Iowa State University, Eta, Alumnus Initiate) – Governor of Iowa
Charles H. Bronson (University of Georgia, Alpha Eta) – former Florida Commissioner of Agriculture
Samuel Brownback (Kansas State University, Alpha Zeta) – Governor of the State of Kansas; United States Senator for Kansas; former, and youngest-ever  Secretary of Agriculture of the state of Kansas; former US Representative
Conrad Burns – United States Senator for Montana
Earl Butz (Purdue) – former Secretary of Agriculture
Ken Givens (Alpha Kappa) – Tennessee Commissioner of Agriculture
Charles Grassley (Iowa State University, Eta)- United States Senator for Iowa
Seth Hammett (Auburn University, Xi) – director of economic development for Alabama Electric Cooperative; former Speaker of the Alabama House of Representatives (member 1979–2011)
Patrick Hooker (Cornell, Zeta) – New York State Commissioner of Agriculture 
Tommy Irvin (University of Georgia, Alpha Eta) – former Georgia Commissioner of Agriculture
Tom Latham (Iowa State University, Eta)- US Representative, Iowa
Jerry Litton – US Representative, Missouri 
Jefferson Miller – US Representative, Florida
Devin Nunes – US Representative, California
John Perdue (West Virginia, Alpha Alpha) – State Treasurer of West Virginia
Rick Perry (Texas A&M, Beta Nu) – Governor of Texas
Adam Putnam (University of Florida) – Florida Commissioner of Agriculture; US Representative, Florida
Robert L.F. Sikes (University of Georgia, Alpha Eta) – former US Representative, Florida
Nick Smith – US Representative, Michigan
Greg Steube (University of Florida) – member of Florida House of Representatives
Gerald Weller – US Representative, Illinois
Joe Don McGaugh- Missouri Associate Circuit Judge, former state representative 
Shawn Jasper – (University of New Hampshire) New Hampshire Commissioner of Agriculture 
Brian Munzlinger (University of Missouri, Theta)- Missouri State Senator, majority whip, chairman of Missouri Senate Agriculture Committee
Barry Moore (Auburn University, Xi)- US Representative, Alabama

References

Lists of members of United States student societies
members